Angad is a Hindic masculine given name that may refer to the following notable people:
Angada, a character in the Ramayana, a Sanskrit epic of ancient India 
Guru Angad (1504–1552), the second of the ten Sikh gurus of Sikhism
Angad Bedi (born 1983), Indian film actor and model
Angad Hasija (born 1984), Indian television actor
Angad Paul (1970–2015), British businessman and film producer

Indian masculine given names